Sclerophrys funerea is a species of toad in the family Bufonidae. It is found in west-central Africa, from Gabon, Republic of the Congo, and Angola eastward through the Democratic Republic of the Congo to Uganda, Rwanda, and Burundi. Its common names are Angola toad or somber toad.

This species occurs in rainforests, usually on slightly drier areas such as ridge tops. It is a leaf litter species. The eggs are deposited in slow-flowing streams during the dry season. It tolerates a slight degree of habitat degradation. Habitat loss is a localized threat.

References

funerea
Frogs of Africa
Amphibians of Angola
Amphibians of Burundi
Amphibians of the Democratic Republic of the Congo
Amphibians of Gabon
Amphibians of the Republic of the Congo
Amphibians of Rwanda
Amphibians of Uganda
Taxa named by José Vicente Barbosa du Bocage
Amphibians described in 1866
Taxonomy articles created by Polbot